Danijel Petković (born on 25 May 1993) is a Montenegrin professional footballer who plays as a goalkeeper for Hungarian club Kisvárda and the Montenegro national team.

Club career
Petković started his career at Bokelj. After gaining promotion with them in 2014, he signed with FK Zeta. After one season with Zeta, he joined Lovćen on a two-year contract.

On 29 August 2016, Petković signed a three-year contract with the Hungarian team MTK Budapest. After spending one season in Hungary, he signed a three-year contract with FC Lorient in July 2017.

International career
Until 2014 he featured regularly for Montenegro U21. On 26 May 2014, he made his Montenegro debut in a 0–0 draw against Iran.

Honours
Bokelj
Montenegrin Second League: 2010-11, 2013-14

References

External links
 

1993 births
Living people
People from Kotor
Association football goalkeepers
Montenegrin footballers
Montenegro under-21 international footballers
Montenegro international footballers
FK Bokelj players
FK Zeta players
FK Lovćen players
MTK Budapest FC players
FC Lorient players
Angers SCO players
Kisvárda FC players
Montenegrin Second League players
Montenegrin First League players
Nemzeti Bajnokság I players
Ligue 2 players
Ligue 1 players
Montenegrin expatriate footballers
Expatriate footballers in Hungary
Montenegrin expatriate sportspeople in Hungary
Expatriate footballers in France
Montenegrin expatriate sportspeople in France